The Second Haines Ministry was the 3rd ministry of the Government of Victoria. It was led by the Premier of Victoria, William Haines, with the swearing in of the ministry occurring on 29 April 1857.

References 

Victoria (Australia) ministries
Ministries of Queen Victoria
Cabinets established in 1857
Cabinets disestablished in 1858
1857 establishments in Australia
1858 establishments in Australia